This is a list of events in British radio during 2002.

Events

January
 8 January – Scot FM becomes part of the Real Radio network when it is purchased by GMG Radio and is renamed accordingly.
January – Atlantic 252 closes after more than twelve years on air.

February
mid February – 107.7 Chelmer FM is renamed Dream 107.7.
9 February – Following the announcement of the death of Princess Margaret, the younger sister of Elizabeth II, some radio and television schedules are changed to make room for tribute programmes. Among the tributes paid to her is an edition of The Archers aired on 10 February, a programme on which the Princess made a personal appearance in 1984.
28 February–1 March – The first three community radio stations – Bradford Community Broadcasting, Cross Rhythms in Stoke and Angel Community Radio (Havant) – start broadcasting as part of a trial of community radio which sees 15 stations go on air during 2002. The trial, under the title of “Access Radio”, saw each station originally licensed for one year. All three stations are still on air today.

March
11 March – Atlantic 252's former frequency and transmitter are briefly used for TEAMtalk 252 – intended as a rival for talkSPORT and BBC Radio 5 Live.

April
No events

May
No events

June
No events

July
 July-August – BBC North West operates BBC 2002, a temporary radio station set up to provide a bespoke service for Greater Manchester of the 2002 Commonwealth Games.
31 July – 
TeamTalk 252 closes after four months on air. The 252 kHz long wave frequency is re-subsumed by Irish broadcaster RTÉ to provide a version of RTÉ Radio 1 to the expatriate community in Britain.
Radio 1 presenter Chris Moyles is criticised by the Broadcasting Standards Commission for remarks he made to Charlotte Church during an edition of his afternoon show.

August
No events

September
27 September – Les Ross presents his final BRMB Breakfast show, live from Birmingham International station. As 9 o'clock approached, he hopped on a train (hauled by electric locomotive 86259 especially named 'Les Ross' by Virgin Trains West Coast) to symbolise the end. He has since preserved this locomotive following its retirement from passenger service.
September – the KM Group rebrands its newly acquired Mercury FM stations as KMFM West Kent and KMFM Medway.

October
28 October – The BBC Asian Network is broadcast nationally for the first time after being launched on DAB.

November
11 November – BBC Radio Swindon launches as an opt-out service from Wiltshire Sound which is renamed BBC Radio Wiltshire.
12 November – The Radio Authority announces that London station Liberty Radio has lost its licence to Club Asia, which had previously been broadcasting for several hours each day on Spectrum Radio. This had been the first time in several years that the incumbent broadcaster's licence had not been renewed. The station had repeatedly only obtained a 0.1% share of listening. 
17 November – Mark Goodier presents the Top 40 on BBC Radio 1 for the final time on the 50th anniversary of the chart.

December
December – Talksport announces plans for the station's first ever music show. An easy listening music show entitled Champagne & Roses with Gerald Harper, is broadcast each Saturday evening. The show is axed after less than six months
20 December – Sir Jimmy Young presents his final lunchtime programme on BBC Radio 2 after nearly 30 years with the network, and 50 years with the BBC.
29 December – 'Doctor' Neil Fox presents the last Pepsi Chart Show.

Station debuts
 
2 February – BBC Radio 5 Live Sports Extra
11 March – 
BBC 6 Music
TeamTalk 252
19 March – Q101.2
25 March – Real Radio Yorkshire
1 May – Resonance FM 
14 July – 102.5 Radio Pembrokeshire
16 August – BBC 1Xtra
31 August – Rugby FM
22 October – Reading 107
28 October – BBC Asian Network on a national platform
11 November – BBC Radio Swindon
15 December – BBC7
Unknown – Smash Hits Radio

Closing this year
January – Atlantic 252 (1989–2002)
31 July – TeamTalk 252 (2002)

Programme debuts
 11 March – The Dream Ticket with Janice Long on BBC 6 Music (2002–2004)
 16 July – Giles Wemmbley-Hogg Goes Off on BBC Radio 4 (2002–2011)
 7 August – Concrete Cow on BBC Radio 4 (2002–2004)
 24 October – The Sofa of Time on BBC Radio 4 (2004)
 15 December – The Big Toe Radio Show on BBC Radio 7 (2002–2011)
 Unknown – A Kist o Wurds on BBC Radio Ulster and BBC Radio Foyle (2002–Present)

Continuing radio programmes

1940s
 Sunday Half Hour (1940–2018)
 Desert Island Discs (1942–Present)
 Letter from America (1946–2004)
 Woman's Hour (1946–Present)
 A Book at Bedtime (1949–Present)

1950s
 The Archers (1950–Present)
 The Today Programme (1957–Present)
 Your Hundred Best Tunes (1959–2007)

1960s
 Farming Today (1960–Present)
 In Touch (1961–Present)
 The World at One (1965–Present)
 The Official Chart (1967–Present)
 Just a Minute (1967–Present)
 The Living World (1968–Present)
 The Organist Entertains (1969–2018)

1970s
 PM (1970–Present)
 Start the Week (1970–Present)
 You and Yours (1970–Present)
 I'm Sorry I Haven't a Clue (1972–Present)
 Good Morning Scotland (1973–Present)
 Newsbeat (1973–Present)
 File on 4 (1977–Present)
 Money Box (1977–Present)
 The News Quiz (1977–Present)
 Feedback (1979–Present)
 The Food Programme (1979–Present)
 Science in Action (1979–Present)

1980s
 Steve Wright in the Afternoon (1981–1993, 1999–Present)
 In Business (1983–Present)
 Sounds of the 60s (1983–Present)
 Loose Ends (1986–Present)

1990s
 The Moral Maze (1990–Present)
 Essential Selection (1991–Present)
 No Commitments (1992–2007)
 Wake Up to Wogan (1993–2009)
 Essential Mix (1993–Present)
 Up All Night (1994–Present)
 Wake Up to Money (1994–Present)
 Private Passions (1995–Present)
 Parkinson's Sunday Supplement (1996–2007)
 The David Jacobs Collection (1996–2013)
 Westway (1997–2005)
 The 99p Challenge (1998–2004)
 Puzzle Panel (1998–2005)
 Sunday Night at 10 (1998–2013)
 Drivetime with Johnnie Walker (1998–2006)
 In Our Time (1998–Present)
 Material World (1998–Present)
 Scott Mills (1998–Present)
 The Now Show (1998–Present)
 It's Been a Bad Week (1999–2006)
 Jonathan Ross (1999–2010)

2000s
 Dead Ringers (2000–2007, 2014–Present)
 BBC Radio 2 Folk Awards (2000–Present)
 Sounds of the 70s (2000–2008, 2009–Present)
 Big John @ Breakfast (2000–Present)
 Comedy Album Heroes (2001–2003)
 Think the Unthinkable (2001–2005)
 Parsons and Naylor's Pull-Out Sections (2001–2007)
 Jammin' (2001–2008)
 Go4It (2001–2009)
 The Jo Whiley Show (2001–2011)
 Kermode and Mayo's Film Review (2001–Present)

Ending this year
 5 February – Little Britain (2000–2002)
 March – The Human Zoo (2000–2002)
 20 March – The Attractive Young Rabbi (1999–2002)
 12 June – The Leopard in Autumn (2001–2002)
 July – Linda Smith's A Brief History of Timewasting (2001–2002)
 29 December – The Pepsi Chart (1993–2002)

Deaths
 12 January – Stanley Unwin, 90, comedian, creator of "Unwinese"
 27 February – Spike Milligan, 83, comedian and writer, writer/performer of The Goon Show''
 31 March – Barry Took, 73, comedy writer and broadcast presenter
 24 July – Maurice Denham, 92, character actor
 27 November – Stanley Black, 89, pianist, bandleader, composer, conductor and arranger
 1 December – Michael Oliver, 65, radio arts presenter

References

radio
British Radio, 2002 In
Years in British radio